VIP Road or Parwati Bagla Road (formerly Amherst Street) is a major arterial road in Kanpur, India. It connects Meghdoot Trisection at Mall Road with Grand Trunk Road at Rawatpur. The road has tall decorated walls on both of its sides. The road houses the bungalows of government officials of the city including the District Magistrate of Kanpur District. Elgin Mills which is the first cotton mill in Kanpur is situated on this road. Chandra Shekhar Azad University of Agriculture and Technology, the only Agricultural University of Uttar Pradesh state is also present here. Uttar Pradesh Textile Technology Institute built in 1914 too is situated on this road. UP Stock Exchange, Green Park Stadium, Merchants Chamber Hall of Uttar Pradesh, The Georgina McRobert Memorial Hospital and DAV College too are located on this road at Woolmer Crossing.

References

Neighbourhoods in Kanpur
Shopping districts and streets in India